Fabio Puglisi (born January 13, 1974), known by his professional name Soul Basement, is an Italian jazz musician, producer and songwriter.

Discography
Time is Ours (2004)
Little Hitches of Living (2005)
The Awakening of the Heart (2007)
These Days (2010)
Yesterday Today Tomorrow (2013)
Behemoths (2015)
What We Leave Behind (2016)
Oneness (2018)
Do No Wrong (2022)

References

External links
Official site

Italian pop musicians
Italian folk musicians
Italian singer-songwriters
Living people
1974 births
People from Syracuse, Sicily
21st-century Italian singers